Peter Claver, SJ (26 June 1580 – 8 September 1654) was a Spanish Jesuit priest and missionary born in Verdú (Catalonia, Spain) who, due to his life and work, became the patron saint of slaves, the Republic of Colombia, and ministry to African Americans. 

During the 40 years of his ministry in the New Kingdom of Granada, it is estimated he personally baptized around 300,000 people and heard the confessions of over 5,000 slaves per year. He is also patron saint for seafarers. He is considered a heroic example of what should be the Christian praxis of love and of the exercise of human rights. 

The Congress of the Republic of Colombia declared September 9 as the Human Rights national Day in his honor.

Early life
He was born 70 years after King Ferdinand of Spain set the colonial slavery culture into motion by authorizing the purchase of 250 African slaves in Lisbon for his territories in New Spain.

Later, as a student at the University of Barcelona, Claver was noted for his intelligence and piety. After two years of study there, Claver wrote these words in the notebook he kept throughout his life: "I must dedicate myself to the service of God until death, on the understanding that I am like a slave."

In the New World
After he had completed his studies, Claver entered the Society of Jesus in Tarragona at the age of 20. When he had completed the novitiate, he was sent to study philosophy at Palma, Mallorca. While there, he came to know the porter of the college, St. Alphonsus Rodriguez, a laybrother known for his holiness and gift of prophecy. Rodriguez felt that he had been told by God that Claver was to spend his life in service in the colonies of New Spain, and he frequently urged the young student to accept that calling.

Claver volunteered for the Spanish colonies and was sent to the New Kingdom of Granada, where he arrived in the port city of Cartagena in 1610. Required to spend six years studying theology before being ordained a priest, he lived in Jesuit houses at Tunja and Bogotá. During those preparatory years, he was deeply disturbed by the harsh treatment and living conditions of the black slaves who were brought from Africa.

By this time, the slave trade had been established in the Americas for about a century. Local natives were considered physically ill-suited to work in the gold and silver mines. Mine owners met their labor requirements by importing blacks from Angola and Congo, whom they purchased in West Africa for four crowns a head or bartered for goods and sold in America for an average two hundred crowns apiece. Others were captured at random, especially able-bodied males and females deemed suitable for labor.

Cartagena was a slave-trading hub and 10,000 slaves poured into the port yearly, crossing the Atlantic from West Africa under conditions so foul that an estimated one-third died in transit. Although the slave trade was condemned by Pope Paul III and Urban VIII had issued a papal decree prohibiting slavery, (later called "supreme villainy" by Pope Pius IX), it was a lucrative business and continued to flourish.

Claver's predecessor in his eventual lifelong mission, Alonso de Sandoval, was his mentor and inspiration. Sandoval devoted himself to serving the slaves for 40 years before Claver arrived to continue his work. Sandoval attempted to learn about their customs and languages; he was so successful that, when he returned to Seville, he wrote a book in 1627 about the nature, customs, rites and beliefs of the Africans. Sandoval found Claver an apt pupil. When he was solemnly professed in 1622, Claver signed his final profession document in Latin as: Petrus Claver, aethiopum semper servus (Peter Claver, servant of the Ethiopians [i.e. Africans] forever).

Ministry to the slaves
Whereas Sandoval had visited the slaves where they worked, Claver preferred to head for the wharf as soon as a slave ship entered the port. Boarding the ship, he entered the filthy and diseased holds to treat and minister to their badly treated, terrified human cargo, who had survived a voyage of several months under horrible conditions. It was difficult to move around on the ships, because the slave traffickers filled them to capacity. The slaves were often told they were being taken to a land where they would be eaten. Claver wore a cloak, which he would lend to anyone in need. A legend arose that whoever wore the cloak received lifetime health and was cured of all disease. After the slaves were herded from the ship and penned in nearby yards to be scrutinized by crowds of buyers, Claver joined them with medicine, food, bread, lemons. With the help of interpreters and pictures which he carried with him, he gave basic instructions.

Claver saw the slaves as fellow Christians, encouraging others to do so as well. During the season when slavers were not accustomed to arrive, he traversed the country, visiting plantation after plantation, to give spiritual consolation to the slaves. During his 40 years of ministry it is estimated that he personally catechized and baptized 300,000 slaves.  He would then follow up on them to ensure that as Christians they received their Christian and civil rights. His mission extended beyond caring for slaves, however. He preached in the city square, to sailors and traders and conducted country missions, returning every spring to visit those he had baptized, ensuring that they were treated humanely. During these missions, whenever possible he avoided the hospitality of planters and overseers; instead, he would lodge in the slave quarters.

Claver's work on behalf of slaves did not prevent him from ministering to the souls of well-to-do members of society, traders and visitors to Cartagena (including Muslims and English Protestants) and condemned criminals, many of whom he spiritually prepared for death; he was also a frequent visitor at the city's hospitals. Through years of unremitting toil and the force of his own unique personality, the slaves' situation slowly improved. In time he became a moral force, the Apostle of Cartagena.

Illness, and death

In the last years of his life Peter was too ill to leave his room. He lingered for four years, largely forgotten and neglected, physically abused and starved by an ex-slave who had been hired by the Superior of the house to care for him. He never complained about his treatment, accepting it as a just punishment for his sins. He died on 8 September 1654.

When the news of his death spread throughout Cartagena many came to his room to pay their last respects. Such was his reputation for holiness that the room was stripped bare of anything that might serve as a relic.

The city magistrates, who had previously considered him a nuisance for his persistent advocacy on behalf of the slaves, ordered a public funeral and he was buried with pomp and ceremony. The scope of Claver's ministry, which was prodigious even before considering the astronomical number of people he baptized, came to be realized only after his death.

He was canonized in 1888 by Pope Leo XIII, along with the Jesuit porter, Alphonsus Rodriguez. In 1896 Pope Leo also declared Claver the patron of missionary work among all African peoples. His body is preserved and venerated in the church of the Jesuit residence, now renamed in his honor.

Legacy

Many organizations, missions, parishes, religious congregations, schools and hospitals bear the name of St. Peter Claver and also claim to continue the Mission of Claver as the following:

The Knights of Peter Claver, Inc., is the largest African-American Catholic fraternal organization in the United States. In 2006, a unit was established in San Andres, Colombia. The Order was founded in Mobile, Alabama, and is presently headquartered in New Orleans.
Claver's mission continues today in the work of the Apostleship of the Sea (AoS) and his inspiration remains among port chaplains and those who visit ships in the name of the church, through the AoS.
The Missionary Sisters of St. Peter Claver are a religious congregation of women dedicated to serving the spiritual and social needs of the poor around the world, particularly in Africa. They were founded in Austria by the Blessed Mary Theresa Ledóchowska in 1894.
Among the many parishes dedicated to St. Peter Claver are those in Lexington, Kentucky, West Hartford, Connecticut, Macon, Georgia, New Orleans, Louisiana, Simi Valley, California, St. Paul, Minnesota,  Sheboygan, Wisconsin, Montclair, New Jersey, Baltimore, Maryland, Huntington, West Virginia, and Nairobi, Kenya.
Among the many schools dedicated to St. Peter Claver are those in Decatur, Georgia, and Pimville, South Africa. The oldest African American school in the Diocese of St. Petersburg, and the oldest African American school still functioning in the State of Florida, is the St. Peter Claver Catholic School.

The Congress of the Republic of Colombia declared September 9 as the Human Rights national Day in his honor.

Controversy
His canonization has caused angst among some due to his own slaveholding and treatment of slaves (including corporal punishment), and it is alleged that these matters may have initially stalled his canonization. Dr. Katie Grimes of Villanova has gone so far as to call Claver a "White Supremacist" and has accused the Catholic Church of "White supremacism" for championing him.

That said, the sources cited by Grimes' in her criticism stated that Claver allowed uncommon freedom for the slaves he purchased (using them in his ministry rather than for hard labor), and resorted to physical punishment solely to prevent what he saw as immoral behavior.

See also
Louis Bertrand
Mary Theresa Ledóchowska
 Saint Peter Claver, patron saint archive

References

External links
 Knights of Peter Claver
 San Pedro Claver, Caribenet
 Apostleship to the Sea (AoS)

1580 births
1654 deaths
People from Urgell
Roman Catholic priests from Catalonia
Catalan Roman Catholic saints
Canonizations by Pope Leo XIII
Colombian Roman Catholic saints
Jesuit missionaries in Colombia
People celebrated in the Lutheran liturgical calendar
People of New Spain
Spanish slave trade
Burials in Colombia
Neurological disease deaths in Spain
Deaths from Parkinson's disease
University of Barcelona alumni
Jesuit saints
Spanish Roman Catholic missionaries
Roman Catholic missionaries in Colombia
African-American Roman Catholicism
Pontifical Xavierian University alumni